Howard Caine (born Howard Cohen; January 2, 1926 – December 28, 1993) was an American character actor, probably best known as Gestapo Major Wolfgang Hochstetter in the television series Hogan's Heroes (1965–71). He also played Lewis Morris of New York in the musical film 1776 and Everett Scovill, a thinly disguised portrait of Charles Manson's attorney Irving Kanarek, in the television movie Helter Skelter.

Early life
Howard Caine was born on January 2, 1926, in Nashville, Tennessee, into a Jewish family. At the age of 13, Cohen moved with his family to New York City, where he began studying acting. Learning to suppress his Southern accent, he went on to become a master of 32 foreign and American dialects. Caine served in the United States Navy during World War II, from 1944 to 1946, fighting the Japanese in the Pacific Theatre. After the war, Caine studied drama at Columbia University, where he graduated summa cum laude.

Career
Caine appeared on Broadway in Wonderful Town, Inherit the Wind, Lunatics and Lovers, and Tiger at the Gates. He succeeded Ray Walston as "Mr. Applegate" in the original production of Damn Yankees. He was featured in such films as From the Terrace (1960), Pay or Die (1960), as the husband of the character portrayed by Judy Garland in Judgment at Nuremberg (1961),  (1962), The Man from the Diner's Club (1963),  (1962), and Alvarez Kelly (1966).

Caine was also a member of the Academy of Motion Picture Arts and Sciences.

He acted in more than 750 live and filmed television programs, including the western series The Californians, Two Faces West, and The Travels of Jaimie McPheeters. He also appeared in Get Smart.

Caine is best remembered for his recurring role (37 episodes) as Major Wolfgang Hochstetter on the popular 1960s sitcom Hogan's Heroes (1965–1971).  Prior to that he appeared on that show in two other roles, in the season one episode "Happy Birthday, Adolf" and the season two episode "The Battle of Stalag 13".  The Major Hochstetter character first appeared later in season two. Hochstetter is a feared Gestapo officer who strongly suspects the prisoners, particularly Colonel Hogan, are engaged in clandestine activities, but he is never able to confirm his suspicions and usually ends up getting his comedic comeuppance. Hochstetter had several catchphrases, including (referring to Hogan) "Who is this man?" and "What is this man doing here?", and "I will surround this camp with a ring of steel." He would also shout "Baah!" as he leaves the room, when frustrated by the camp's incompetent commanding officer, Colonel Klink. The Major self-identifies as a Gestapo agent but usually dresses in the pre-war uniform of the SS Schutzstaffel.

From his early childhood in Tennessee, Caine had always been fascinated with the Appalachian five-string bluegrass banjo and began mastering it in the mid-1960s. From the summer of 1970 until his death in 1993, he took trophies at 29 prominent banjo and fiddle contests in the southland for both Best Traditional Banjo and Traditional Singing. He was also a popular folk singer and appeared at a number of prominent folk clubs and folk festivals.

Death
Caine died of a heart attack on December 28, 1993, five days short of his 68th birthday.

Partial credits

References

External links

1926 births
1993 deaths
Male actors from New York (state)
Male actors from Nashville, Tennessee
American male film actors
American male musical theatre actors
American male stage actors
American male television actors
Burials at Eden Memorial Park Cemetery
Jewish American male actors
People from Nashville, Tennessee
Singers from New York City
Male actors from Los Angeles
United States Navy personnel of World War II
United States Navy sailors
20th-century American male actors
20th-century American singers
20th-century American male singers
Military personnel from Tennessee
20th-century American Jews